Cogoleto is a comune (municipality) in the Metropolitan City of Genoa in the Italian region Liguria, located about  west of Genova. Its territory extends from the sea to the Ligurian Apennines; it is part of the Natural Regional Park of Monte Beigua.

History
The area of Cogoleto is identified in the Roman Peutingerian Table as Hasta, with a bridge (destroyed in World War II by Allied bombings) existing here. The first mention of the town dates to 1039, and in 1091 it was included in Bonifacio del Vasto's Marquisate of Savona. In 1343 it was acquired by the Republic of Genoa.

On April 11, 1800 it was the seat of a battle between the French and Austrian armies. Cogoleto became part of the Kingdom of Sardinia in 1815, following its history in the unification of Italy and modern Italian history.

Main sights
Oratory of St. Lawrence, dating to the 13th century
 Orto Botanico di Villa Beuca, a botanical garden
Birthplace of Christopher Columbus

Twin towns
 Ober-Ramstadt, Germany, since 1960 
 Santa Coloma de Gramenet, Spain, since 1997 
 Olympia, Greece, since 2005 
 Saint-André-les-Vergers, France, since 2005

Nature conservation 
Part of the municipality territory is within the boundaries of the Parco naturale regionale del Beigua.

Notable people
Cogoleto is known for the Italian rappers Tedua and Izi.

References

Cities and towns in Liguria